Henric Trenk (also known as Henri or Heinrich Trenk; 1818–5 July 1892) was a Swiss-born Romanian painter and graphic artist, best known for his Romantic landscapes and his association with writer and amateur archaeologist Alexandru Odobescu.

Biography
Born to an ethnic German family in Zug, Trenk studied at the Kunstakademie in Düsseldorf, in the Kingdom of Prussia's Rhine Province. He first arrived in the Austrian-ruled region of Transylvania around 1846, and moved to Wallachia in 1851. He remained in Wallachia as it became a constituent part of the Romanian Kingdom, and never again left its territory. Later in life, Trenk was naturalized a Romanian.

He came to associate with Odobescu, and was appointed by the latter official illustrator of the magazines printed by the Romanian Commission of Historical Monuments. Trenk traveled throughout the regions of Muntenia and Oltenia, creating a large number of oil paintings featuring rural scenes, historical relics, and natural scenes—including several depictions of the Olt River near the Cozia Monastery. For a while, he taught drawing at a Bucharest gymnasium, and had the major Romanian painter Ion Andreescu among his students.

Work
With support from Odobescu, who was attempting to build a record of historical locations and folklore, Henric Trenk documented places of interest, as well as genre scenes in the Wallachian Plain—fairs, inns, lodgings, as well as more exotic portrayals of Roma people and the distinctively-dressed Romanian postilions. While admired for their exactitude (unprecedented in Romanian art), these works have drawn criticism for their impersonality.

Among his most distinctive works is a mountainous landscape of the Olt at the meanders of Cozia (known locally as Cârlige, "Hooks"), which was attributed by some to his nostalgia for the Alpine landscape. A similar feeling motivation was deduced from his earlier paintings, the Romantic picturesque landscapes showing the Southern Carpathian areas of Transylvania.

Trenk was also active in research towards improving the paint used in fine arts, publishing in several chemistry journals. His aim was to find a paint which  would be durable, but also matte, avoiding distracting reflections on the painting's surface. His successful invention of such a paint was announced in a February 1869 note by Carol Szathmari, court painter of Domnitor Carol I of Romania.

Gallery
Click on an image to view it enlarged.

Notes

References
Vasile Drăguț, Marin Mihalache, Pictura românească în imagini, Editura Meridiane, Bucharest, 1970.

External links

1818 births
1892 deaths
People from Zug
Swiss-German people
Kunstakademie Düsseldorf alumni
19th-century Romanian painters
Romanian civil servants
Romanian illustrators
19th-century Romanian inventors
Romanian schoolteachers
Romanian people of German descent
Swiss illustrators
19th-century Swiss inventors
Swiss romantic painters
Romanian romantic painters
Naturalised citizens of Romania
Romanian people of Swiss descent
Swiss expatriates in Romania